Pisgah Branch is a stream in Audrain and Randolph Counties in the U.S. state of Missouri.

Pisgah Branch took its name from Pisgah Baptist Church.

See also
List of rivers of Missouri

References

Rivers of Audrain County, Missouri
Rivers of Randolph County, Missouri
Rivers of Missouri